Latin alternative, or "alterlatino", is a brand of Latin rock music produced by combining genres like alternative rock, lofi, chillout, metal, electronica, hip hop, new wave, pop rock, punk rock, reggae, and ska with traditional Ibero-American sounds, in Latin Europeans and Latin Americans countries (Spanish, Italian, Portuguese, French and Catalan languages).

History
Rock music has been produced in Iberian America since the late 1950s. Some rock bands started to use unusual instruments such as maracas and quenas. In the late 1960s, artists like Santana started using a different technique to make rock music; by incorporating influences of Latin jazz. Its sound was incorporated by young Latino-players in the US, as an answer to the rock en Español movement in Americas and Spain led by bands like Héroes del Silencio, Caifanes or Los Prisioneros.

In the early 1990s, it was used by Mexican bands such as Maldita Vecindad and Café Tacuba, they were accepted on the Latino circuit in the US, especially by the Mexican community. Subsequently, experimental musician Lynda Thomas earned recognition and commercial success with alternative music in the same decade.

With the passage of time and many musical styles in the US-Latin, Latin alternative has become as diverse as the rock music genre itself. Today, many music journalists and fans regard Latin alternative as a subgenre of rock en Español, and like rock en Español, it may be further divided into more specific genres of music.

Events and media coverage
The most known event of Latin alternative is the Latin Alternative Music Conference (LAMC) that every year gathers a large number of bands from all over the Americas and Spain. The conference was co-founded by artist manager Tomas Cookman and music executive Josh Norek. It was first held in New York City in 2000, moved briefly to Los Angeles, and then returned to New York. The 2009 event featured artists from across the Americas including Argentina's Juana Molina, Puerto Rican hip-hop and reggaeton outfit Calle 13, Colombian group Bomba Estéreo, Brazilian singer-songwriter Curumin and Mexico's Natalia Lafourcade, and was profiled along with the wider Latin alternative scene in an article in The New York Times.

Notable bands and artists by country

Argentina
 Karamelo Santo
 Bersuit Vergarabat
 Cabezones
 Érica García
 Illya Kuryaki and the Valderramas
 Juana Molina
 La Yegros
 Los Fabulosos Cadillacs
 Vicentico
 Los Auténticos Decadentes
 Los Piojos
 Todos Tus Muertos

Brazil
 Chico Science
 Marcelo D2
 O Rappa

Canada
Alex Cuba
Santa Lucia LFR
The Mariachi Ghost

Chile
Joe Vasconcellos
La Floripondio
Chico Trujillo
Juana Fé
 Tiro de gracia
 Los Bunkers
 Los Tres
 Mon Laferte
 Daniel Puente Encina
 Rubio
 Alex Anwandter
GEPE
Pedro Piedra
Spiral Vortex
CAF
De Pereiras
Lanza Internacional
Lopez
La Brígida Orquesta
Camila Moreno

Colombia
 Andrea Echeverri
 Aterciopelados
 Bomba Estéreo
 Cabas
 Carlos Vives
 Estados Alterados
 Juanes
 Monareta
 Ondatrópica
 LosPetitFellas
 Nicolás y los Fumadores

Costa Rica
 Akasha
 Debi Nova
 Escats
 Gandhi
 Jose Capmany
 Pneuma

Cuba
 Addys Mercedes
 Porno Para Ricardo
 Alex Cuba
 Madera Limpia

Dominican Republic
 Alex Ferreira
 Carolina Camacho
 Toque Profundo
 Rita Indiana

France
 Mano Negra

Guatemala
 Di WAV
 Gaby Moreno
 Jesse Baez
 Easy Easy

Italy
Talco
Egin
Notagitana

Japan
Porno Graffitti

Mexico
 Caifanes
 Lynda Thomas
 Café Tacvba
 Tijuana No
 La Lupita
 La Gusana Ciega
 Molotov
 Control Machete
 El Gran Silencio
 Plastilina Mosh
 COhETICA
 Jumbo
 Zurdok
 Kinky
 Zoé
 Akwid
 Cartel de Santa
 Mexican Institute of Sound
 Nortec Collective
 Bostich
 Fussible
 Natalia Lafourcade
 Ximena Sariñana
 Los Concorde
 Ely Guerra
 Julieta Venegas
 Sonex

Panama
 Los Rabanes

Puerto Rico
 Calle 13
 Circo
 Draco Rosa
 Zayra Alvarez

Spain
 Amaral
 Amparanoia
 Bebe
 Chambao
 Che Sudaka
 Enrique Bunbury
 Jarabe De Palo
 Héroes del Silencio
 Love of Lesbian
 Macaco
 La Mala Rodríguez
 Ojos de Brujo
 The Pinker Tones
 Radio Futura
 Christina Rosenvinge
 Ska-P
 Vetusta Morla

United States
 Bang Data
 Grupo Fantasma
 Hip Hop Hoodíos
 Origen
 Orixa
 Ozomatli
 Pacha Massive
 Ritchie Valens
 Santana
 Very Be Careful
 Yerba Buena
 Quetzal
 Aaron Andreu

Uruguay
 Hablan Por La Espalda
 Diego Janssen
 La Vela Puerca
 No Te Va Gustar
 Peyote Asesino
 Sante Les Amis

Venezuela
 Los Amigos Invisibles
 Devendra Banhart
 Jeremías
 Rawayana
 Simon Grossman
 La Vida Boheme

Record labels for Latin alternative music
 Nacional Records
 Afonico Music
 Doula Music
 Happy-fi
 Six Degrees Records
 Surco
 K Industria Cultural
 EMI Latin
 Waxploitation
 Round Whirled Records

See also

Latin Grammy Award for Best Alternative Music Album
Mangue Bit

References

External links
Defining Latin Alternative Music

Spanish-language music
Alternative rock genres
Rock en Español
 
Latin music genres